Lee Eun-jin (born March 17, 1979), better known by her stage name Yangpa (lit. Onion), is a South Korean singer. She debuted in 1996 with the hit single "Novice's Love."

History

1990s
Yangpa debuted in 1996 with the album Novice's Love, which was the most successful album of her career. Her second album, I Want to Know, was moderately successful, as was her third album, Addio.

2000s
Although active at the beginning of the decade, Yangpa began to experience health issues, causing her to go on hiatus. She released an album in 2007 titled The Windows of My Soul and collaborated with the singer Miho, but her activities were short lived and she once again went on a break.

2010s
In early 2011, it was announced that Yangpa had signed onto Core Contents Media and would be making her comeback after her four-year absence. Her EP Elegy Nouveau, which contained the self-composed tracks "Bon Appetit" and "그때 그 사람", was released on March 28, 2011. After the concept photos for the album were released, controversy aroused over whether or not the singer had gotten cosmetic surgery. Her agency initially denied the claims, but Yangpa stated in a later interview that she had had some work done.

Yangpa released the song "Sarangeun da Geureongeoraeyo" ("Love Is All the Same") featuring Davichi's Lee Haeri and F-ve Dolls member Han Na-Yeon (HANNA) on April 4, 2012, and announced that she would be releasing a new album titled Together. Shortly after the song's release, an alternative version of the song titled "Ibyeoreun da Geureongeoraeyo" ("Parting Is All the Same") featuring Speed's Shin Jong Kook was released.

On October 22, 2016, Yangpa participated in Immortal Song 2 and won that broadcast with 435 points.

Discography

Studio albums

Compilation albums

Extended plays

Singles

Soundtrack appearances

Awards

KBS Entertainment Awards

Mnet Asian Music Awards 

|-
| 1999
| "아디오"
| rowspan=3|Best Female Artist
| 
|-
| 2001
| "Special Night"
| 
|-
| rowspan=5|2007
| rowspan=3|"Love... What Is It?"
| 
|-
|Best Ballad Performance
|
|-
|Artist of the Year
|
|-
|
|Song of the Year
|
|-
|The Windows of My Soul
|Album of the Year
|

References

South Korean women pop singers
People from Seoul
1979 births
Living people
MBK Entertainment artists
21st-century South Korean singers
21st-century South Korean women singers